was a Japanese animator who worked with Toei Animation, Nippon Animation, TMS Entertainment, and Studio Ghibli. He was considered to be one of Japan's foremost animators, and he was an important mentor to both Hayao Miyazaki and Isao Takahata.

Biography
Ōtsuka was born in Shimane Prefecture. During a visit to Tsuwano at the age of 10, he saw a steam locomotive for the first time. He began to take an interest in locomotives and their operation and would frequently sketch them. In 1945, his family moved to Yamaguchi Prefecture where there was a military base. He began to draw the array of military vehicles located there while also drawing a variety of subjects in different styles. Otsuka also collected cuttings of cartoon strips into scrapbooks to learn more about drawing styles. Otsuka joined Yamaguchi's Bureau of Statistics but later wanted to become a political cartoonist in Tokyo. However at the time, permission was needed to move to Tokyo so he applied to the Health and Welfare Ministry. After passing the exam, he was assigned to the drug enforcement division as an assistant who maintained the firearms of the agents. Around this time he suffered from tuberculosis.

Career
In 1956, Otsuka saw an advertisement in the Yomiuri Shinbun where Toei was soliciting job applications for animators. After passing the test, Otsuka worked with Yasuji Mori and Akira Daikubara on The Tale of the White Serpent and learnt their approaches. Wanting to learn more animation theory, he began to seek out textbooks and was shown a textbook on US animation written by Preston Blair. After working on Magic Boy in 1959, his animation of a skeleton was unintentionally considered comical due to its realism. This led to comical bad guy characters becoming Otsuka's specialty. He came to believe that genuine realism doesn't suit animation and "constructed realism" is more suitable. Hayao Miyazaki compared Otsuka to Kenichi Enomoto in the use of this approach. After completion of his next film, The Wonderful World of Puss 'n Boots, Otsuka left Toei to join A Production.

Otsuka has written several books about the anime industry. His  is considered "a prime resource for the history of 1960s and 1970s anime".

In July 2002, an exhibition of his work and personal pieces was held in Ginza.

From 2003 until his death, Otsuka was an advisor to Telecom Animation Film.

Works

References

External links
 "Conversation between Otsuka Yasuo and Sadamoto Yoshiyuki"
 

1931 births
2021 deaths
Anime character designers
Japanese animators
Lupin the Third
People from Shimane Prefecture
Studio Ghibli people
Toei Animation